Rao Bahadur Dewan E.K.  Govindan (1875–1944) was a Thalassery notable who ruled the first malayali man Pudukotta administratively, then served as Dewan of Pudukotta. He was an English writer and civil servant.

Born in Thalassery in 1875 as the son of Dewan EK Krishnan and Devi Kuru of the famous Idavalat Kakkat family in Thalassery; she was the sister of the famous EK Janaki Ammal. [2] Janaki Ammal is one of the few Indian women to have earned a doctorate (D.Sc.,D.Sc) in science in British India.  Janaki Ammal was the first to win the Barbour Fellowship from the East.  After graduating with a degree in education, E.K Govindan assumed the post of Dewan of the British Presidency of Putukota.  Govindan is the second member of this family after his father to enter the British service.  He was promoted first as Political Agent and later as Administrator of the Pudukkottai State then working under the East India Company.

References

Dewan Bahadurs
1875 births
1944 deaths